In the Imperial Russian army, General of the Artillery was the second-highest possible rank, below Generalissimo of Russia or General-Fieldmarshal, produced by splitting General-in-Chief into service branches.

Military of the Russian Empire
Artillery of the Russian Empire